Zhao Mausoleum (昭陵; pinyin: Zhāolíng; "Zhao" means the light of the sun) is the mausoleum of Emperor Taizong of Tang (599–649).

It is located in Jiuzong Mountain, Shaanxi, China, it is the biggest mausoleum of the Tang Dynasty. Besides being the last resting place of Emperor Taizong of Tang it has additional 200 accompanied tombs around.

The famous stone reliefs Six Steeds of Zhao Mausoleum are exhibited in the Stele Forest Museum of Xi'an (4 steeds) and Museum of the University of Pennsylvania, U.S. (2 steeds) separately.  They were probably designed by the court painter and administrator Yan Liben, who is recorded as making other works for the mausoleum, and may have designed the whole mausoleum.

Planning began in 636 after the death of the Empress Zhangsun, who requested a simple burial.

See also
 List of mausoleums
 Qianling Mausoleum

Notes

References
 Loehr, Max, The Great Painters of China, 1980, Phaidon Press,

External links
 

Buildings and structures in Shaanxi
Burial sites of imperial Chinese families
Tang dynasty architecture
Emperor Taizong of Tang
Major National Historical and Cultural Sites in Shaanxi